Frank Crowe was an Australian rugby league footballer of the 1930s. He played two brief seasons in the New South Wales Rugby League Premiership for South Sydney.

Playing career 
In 1928, Crowe made his professional rugby league debut against University in a Round 3 win. He played the following game in a 7-9 loss to Eastern Suburbs and would not appear again until 1933.

Returning at his usual position as hooker, Crowe made an appearance for the first time in five years in a double-digit loss to Easts. He played 3 more games in the regular season. South Sydney concluded the season 3rd, below Easts (who also had 8 wins, but had a better point differential). Souths played Newtown in the semi-final on a Saturday afternoon. Crowe played the game, however, his team lost 17-12 to the eventual premiers.

Crowe would not play another game after Souths' Semi Final loss. He concluded his career with 8 appearances.

References 

South Sydney Rabbitohs players
Rugby league hookers
Australian rugby league players